Hilde Houben-Bertrand (born Genk, 24 May 1940) is a Belgian politician of the Christian Democratic and Flemish Party (CD&V). She is best known for being a former governor of the Belgian province Limburg.

References 

1940 births
Living people
Governors of Limburg (Belgium)
Women governors of provinces of Belgium
Christian Democratic and Flemish politicians